Tyrosine kinase with immunoglobulin-like and EGF-like domains 1 also known as TIE1 is an angiopoietin receptor which in humans is encoded by the TIE1 gene.

Function 

TIE1 is a cell surface protein expressed exclusively in endothelial cells, however it has also been shown to be expressed in immature hematopoietic cells and platelets. TIE1 upregulates the cell adhesion molecules (CAMs) VCAM-1, E-selectin, and ICAM-1  through a p38-dependent mechanism. Attachment of monocyte derived immune cells  to endothelial cells is also enhanced by TIE1 expression. TIE1 has a proinflammatory effect and may play a role in the endothelial inflammatory diseases such as atherosclerosis.

See also 
 Angiopoietin#Tie pathway

References

External links 
 

Tyrosine kinase receptors
Proteins